The Battle of Mankulam was fought from 14 November 1990 in Mankulam, Sri Lanka. The Sri Lankan military camp at Mankulam was put to siege by the Liberation Tigers of Tamil Eelam (LTTE) for several days before they captured it.

References

1990 in Sri Lanka
Battles of Eelam War II
Conflicts in 1990
November 1990 events in Asia